Hyangchal (literally "vernacular letters", "local letters", or "corresponded sound") is an archaic writing system of Korea and was used to transcribe the Korean language in Chinese characters. Using the hyangchal system, Chinese characters were given a Korean reading based on the syllable associated with the character. The hyangchal writing system is often classified as a subgroup of the Idu script. 

The first mention of hyangchal is the monk Kyun Ye's biography during the Goryeo period. Hyangchal is best known as the method Koreans used to write hyangga poetry. Twenty-five such poems still exist and show that vernacular poetry used native Korean words and Korean word order, and each syllable was "transcribed with a single graph". The writing system covered nouns, verbs, adjectives, adverbs, particles, suffixes, and auxiliary verbs. The practice of hyangchal continued during the Goryeo era, where it was used to record native Korean poetry as well.

See also
 Idu script
 Hanja

References

 
 

Korean writing system